Dandakam or Dhandakam (Telugu: దండకం) is a literary style of poetry seen in Sanskrit prosody, Telugu and Kannada languages. The Stotrams of the Dandakam exceed 26 syllables, and resemble prose. Though verbose and rich in content, Dandakams are actually rarely found in Sanskrit literature when compared to general Stotrams perhaps due to their very complex structure. Most of the Dandakams can be set to a musical notation and are generally sung as Ragamalikas instead of chanting them in the form of Mantras.

Famous Sanskrit Dandakams
 Shyamala Dandakam - Kalidasa - Perhaps the most famous Dandakam, this Stotram praises the divine goddess Shyamala Devi. This Dandakam was popularized by the legendary singer D.K. Pattammal.
 Garuda Dandakam - Vedanta Desika - It is said that Desika composed it to summon the mighty Garuda when a snake charmer challenged him.
Komala Dandakam - Velambur Sri Varada Vishnu Kavi (Kettandapatti Andavan) - This beautiful Dandakam is composed on Komalavalli Nachiyar presiding in the Kumbakonam Divya Desam.

Famous Telugu Dandakams
 Mouni Dandakam - Mallikarjuna Pandit
 Bhogini Dandakam - Potana
 Astabhasha Dandakam - Tallapaka Chinathirumalacharyulu
 Tristhali Dandakam - Nandi Thimmana
 Srungara Dandakam - Tallapaka Pedathirumalacharyulu
 Rama Dandakam - Kancharla Gopanna
 Krishna Dandakam - Tekumalla Rangasai
 Rajagopala Dandakam - Kavaturi Raghavaiah
 Nrisimha Dandakam - Enugu Lakshmanna
 Anjaneya Dandakam

Famous Kannada Dandakams
 Lakshmi Narasimha Pradhurbhava Dandakam - Sripadaraja

References

 Samagra Andhra Sahityam, Arudra, Volume 3, Telugu Akademi, Hyderabad, 2004, Pages: 516-30.

Telugu-language literature